Petar Bosančić (born 19 April 1996) is a Croatian professional footballer who plays as a centre back for Latvian Higher League club Riga.

Club career
Petar Bosančić started his career in the NK Solin youth academy, moving to the nearby giants Hajduk Split at the beginning of 2012. In the 2014–15 season, he established himself as a regular in Hajduk's third-tier B team, before making his debut for the injury and suspension-riddled first team on 26 April 2015 away 2–0 win against Slaven Belupo.

In March 2023, Bosančić signed for Latvian Higher League club Riga.

International career
Though, as of April 2015, he hasn't played a single youth international match, Bosančić was placed on the extended, preliminary 35 candidate list for the Croatia U17 team for the 2013 2013 FIFA U-17 World Cup, not making the final cut.

References

External links
 
 

1996 births
Living people
Footballers from Split, Croatia
Association football central defenders
Croatian footballers
Croatia under-21 international footballers
HNK Hajduk Split players
NK Dugopolje players
NK Sesvete players
NK Istra 1961 players
FC Mariupol players
NK Široki Brijeg players
PFC Cherno More Varna players
Riga FC players
Croatian Football League players
First Football League (Croatia) players
Ukrainian Premier League players
Premier League of Bosnia and Herzegovina players
Croatian expatriate footballers
Expatriate footballers in Ukraine
Croatian expatriate sportspeople in Ukraine
Expatriate footballers in Bosnia and Herzegovina
Croatian expatriate sportspeople in Bosnia and Herzegovina
Expatriate footballers in Bulgaria
Croatian expatriate sportspeople in Bulgaria
Expatriate footballers in Latvia
Croatian expatriate sportspeople in Latvia